Sonja Pleysier is a former Belgian racing cyclist. She finished in second place in the Belgian National Road Race Championships in 1979.

References

External links

Year of birth missing (living people)
Living people
Belgian female cyclists
Place of birth missing (living people)
People from Torhout
Cyclists from West Flanders